The Come Up is an American eight-part television documentary series which premiered on September 13, 2022 on Freeform. The series follows six up-and-coming artists and entertainers in a "post-pandemic" New York City.

Cast
Taofeek Abijako, a Nigerian-born fashion designer who had become the youngest to exhibit at New York Fashion Week.
Fernando Casablancas, the son of modeling agent John Casablancas.
Ben Hard, a stage actor, stand-up comedian, photographer, and videographer.
Claude Shwartz, a stage actress.
Ebon Trower, a club promoter and fashion model.
Sophia Wilson, a photographer.

Production
On April 5, 2022, it was announced that Freeform had ordered the series under the working title Day to Night, as part of a new slate of non-scripted programming. In August 2022, the series was retitled The Come Up, and its first four episodes were set to premiere on September 13, 2022. Freeform president Tara Duncan stated that the series' cast members were "pursuing love and art on their own terms, [and] redefining what success means".

Episodes

References

External links

2020s American documentary television series
2020s American television miniseries
2022 American television series debuts
2022 American television series endings
English-language television shows
Freeform (TV channel) original programming